{{DISPLAYTITLE:Tau5 Eridani}}

Tau5 Eridani, Latinized from τ5 Eridani, is a binary star system in the constellation Eridanus. It is visible to the naked eye with a combined apparent visual magnitude of 4.26. The distance to this system, as estimated using the parallax technique, is around 293 light years.

Tau5 Eridani is a double-lined spectroscopic binary system. The two stars orbit each other closely with a period of 6.2 days and an eccentricity of 0.2. On average, the two stars are separated by around 0.183 AU.

The primary component is a B-type main sequence star with a stellar classification of B0 V. It is around 157 million years old and is spinning with a projected rotational velocity of 55 km/s. The star has around 3.3 times the mass of the Sun and 3.2 times the Sun's radius. It radiates 188 times the solar luminosity from an outer atmosphere at an effective temperature of 12,514 K.

The secondary component has a stellar classification of B9 V. It is slightly smaller, with an estimated size equal to 2.6 times the radius of the Sun.

Although τ5 Eridani has no bright visual companion stars, the galaxy IC 1953 is less than 10' away.  It is one of the brighter members of a loose group of galaxies called the Eridanus Group scattered around the components of τ Eridani.

References

B-type main-sequence stars
Eridanus (constellation)
Eridani, Tau5
Eridani, 19
022203
016611
1088
Spectroscopic binaries
Durchmusterung objects